Daisy: The Adventures of a Lady is a 1923 German silent romantic drama film directed by Frederic Zelnik and starring Lya Mara, Alfons Fryland, and Hans Schüren. It premiered at the Marmorhaus in Berlin.

The film's sets were designed by the art director Georg Meyer.

Cast
Lya Mara
Alfons Fryland
Hans Schüren
Adolphe Engers
Lili Alexandra
Olga Engl
Frida Richard
Ilka Grüning

Frederic Zelnik

References

External links

Films of the Weimar Republic
Films directed by Frederic Zelnik
German silent feature films
1923 romantic drama films
German romantic drama films
Silent romantic drama films
1920s German films